The 1950 United States House of Representatives elections in South Carolina were held on November 7, 1950 to select six Representatives for two-year terms from the state of South Carolina.  Four incumbents were re-elected, but Hugo S. Sims, Jr. of the 2nd congressional district and James Butler Hare of the 3rd congressional district were defeated in the Democratic primaries.  The seats were retained by the Democrats and the composition of the state delegation remained solely Democratic.

1st congressional district
Incumbent Democratic Congressman L. Mendel Rivers of the 1st congressional district, in office since 1941, defeated A.J. Clement in the Democratic primary and was unopposed in the general election.

Democratic primary

General election results

|-
| 
| colspan=5 |Democratic hold
|-

2nd congressional district
Incumbent Democratic Congressman Hugo S. Sims, Jr. of the 2nd congressional district, in office since 1949, was defeated in the Democratic primary by John J. Riley who was unopposed in the general election.

Democratic primary

General election results

|-
| 
| colspan=5 |Democratic hold
|-

3rd congressional district
Incumbent Democratic Congressman James Butler Hare of the 3rd congressional district, in office since 1949, was defeated in the Democratic primary by W.J. Bryan Dorn who was unopposed in the general election.

Democratic primary

General election results

|-
| 
| colspan=5 |Democratic hold
|-

4th congressional district
Incumbent Democratic Congressman Joseph R. Bryson of the 4th congressional district, in office since 1939, defeated Matthew Poliakoff in the Democratic primary and was unopposed in the general election.

Democratic primary

General election results

|-
| 
| colspan=5 |Democratic hold
|-

5th congressional district
Incumbent Democratic Congressman James P. Richards of the 5th congressional district, in office since 1933, was unopposed in his bid for re-election.

General election results

|-
| 
| colspan=5 |Democratic hold
|-

6th congressional district
Incumbent Democratic Congressman John L. McMillan of the 6th congressional district, in office since 1939, was unopposed in his bid for re-election.

General election results

|-
| 
| colspan=5 |Democratic hold
|-

See also
United States House of Representatives elections, 1950
United States Senate election in South Carolina, 1950
South Carolina gubernatorial election, 1950
South Carolina's congressional districts

References

"Supplemental Report of the Secretary of State to the General Assembly of South Carolina." Reports and Resolutions of South Carolina to the General Assembly of the State of South Carolina. Columbia, SC: 1951, pp. 8–10.

1950
South Carolina
United States House of Representatives